Malacothamnus helleri is a species of flowering plant in the mallow family known by the common name Heller's bushmallow. It is endemic to Northern California, where it is a rare species. It has a California Rare Plant Rank of 3.3 (Plants about which more information is needed; not very threatened in California). Malacothamnus hellerii is occasionally treated within Malacothamnus fremontii.

References

External links
Calflora Profile: Malacothamnus helleri
'' Photo gallery at Calphotos

Flora of California
Endemic flora of California
helleri
Natural history of Colusa County, California
Natural history of Lake County, California
Natural history of Napa County, California
Plants described in 1936
Taxa named by Alice Eastwood
Flora without expected TNC conservation status